Caíque de Jesus Gonçalves (born 10 October 1995), simply known as Caíque, is a Brazilian footballer who plays as a defensive midfielder for Ceará.

Career
Born in Guarulhos, São Paulo, Caíque began his career on Portuguesa. On 12 February 2015 he was included in the 28-man list for the year's Campeonato Paulista.

On 4 March Caíque made his senior debut, coming on as a second half substitute for Léo Costa in a 3–1 Copa do Brasil away win against Santos-AP. He made his Paulistão debut on the 21st, again from the bench in a 1–1 away draw against Mogi Mirim.

References

External links

1995 births
Living people
People from Guarulhos
Footballers from São Paulo (state)
Brazilian footballers
Association football midfielders
Campeonato Brasileiro Série B players
Campeonato Brasileiro Série C players
Campeonato Brasileiro Série D players
Associação Portuguesa de Desportos players
Associação Ferroviária de Esportes players
Sertãozinho Futebol Clube players
Esporte Clube Água Santa players
Ituano FC players
Ceará Sporting Club players